The Cromer Forest Bed is a geological formation in Norfolk, England. It consists of river gravels, estuary and floodplain sediments predominantly clays and muds as well as sands along the coast of northern Norfolk. It is the type locality for the Cromerian Stage of the Pleistocene between 0.8 and 0.5 million years ago. The deposit itself range varies in age from about 2 to 0.5 million years ago. It is about 6 metres thick and is exposed in cliff section near the town of West Runton. For over a century the bed, named after the local town of Cromer, has been famous for its assemblage of fossil mammal remains, containing the diverse remains of numerous taxa, including deer, carnivorans and birds. Although most of the forest bed is now obscured by coastal defence, the Cromer Forest Bed continues to be eroded and is rich in fossils including the skeletal remains of the West Runton Mammoth which was discovered in 1990. The oldest human footprints outside Africa, the Happisburgh footprints as well as handaxes and bison bones with cut marks were also found in layers considered to belong to this deposit near the town of Happisburgh.

See also
Cromerian Stage
Happisburgh
Pakefield

References

Further reading
Bowen, D.Q., 1978, Quaternary geology: a stratigraphic framework for multidisciplinary work.  Pergamon Press, Oxford, United Kingdom. 221 pp. 
West, R.G., 1980, The pre-glacial Pleistocene of the Norfolk and Suffolk Coasts Cambridge University Press. 
Ehlers, J., P. L. Gibbard, and J. Rose, eds., 1991, Glacial deposits in Great Britain and Ireland Balkema, Rotterdam. 580 pp 
Mangerud, J., J. Ehlers, and P. Gibbard, 2004, Quaternary Glaciations: Extent and Chronology 1: Part I Europe, Elsevier, Amsterdam.  
Sibrava, V., Bowen, D.Q, and Richmond, G.M., 1986, Quaternary Glaciations in the Northern Hemisphere, Quaternary Science Reviews, vol. 5, pp. 1–514.

External links
Gibbard, P.L., S. Boreham, K.M. Cohen and A. Moscariello, 2007, Global correlation tables for the Quaternary, Subcommission on Quaternary Stratigraphy, Department of Geography, University of Cambridge, Cambridge, England.

Stone Age Britain
Pleistocene
Archaeology of Norfolk